Macronix International Co., Ltd. (MCIX; often shortened to Macronix) is an integrated device manufacturer in the non-volatile memory (NVM) market. The company manufactures NOR Flash, NAND Flash, and ROM products for the consumer, communication, computing, automotive, and networking markets. Its headquarters are located in Taiwan.

History
Macronix was established in 1989. In 1997 the company was a global supplier of Mask ROM and EPROMs.

In 2012 the company developed a process to prolong the life of solid state drives.

Macronix developed specialized memory chips for the consumer electronics industry, including those used in Nintendo's 3DS and Switch devices, and Samsung's wearable electronic devices.

In 2014 the company had around 4,500 employees and a capitalization of NT$33.8 Billion (as of 2011/12/31). Total revenue was NT$22.4 Billion, although the company experienced overall operating losses. That year Macronix was involved in an unsuccessful patent infringement legal battle with competitor Spansion Inc.

As of 2016, Macronix had branches in Europe, the United States, Japan, Korea, Singapore and China, and was the largest supplier of Mask ROMs in the world. The company experienced operating losses and its credit rating on the Taiwan Stock Exchange was downgraded.

References

External links

Company overview

Computer memory companies
Electronics companies established in 1989
Semiconductor companies of Taiwan
Taiwanese brands
Taiwanese companies established in 1989